Bhavnagar Thermal Power Station or Padva Thermal Power Station is a coal-based thermal power plant located in Padva village near Ghogha town in Bhavnagar district, Gujarat. The power plant is owned by Bhavnagar Energy Company Limited. Bharat Heavy Electricals is executing the project.

Capacity
The planned capacity of the power plant in 500 MW.

References

Coal-fired power stations in Gujarat
Bhavnagar district
Energy infrastructure completed in 2016
2016 establishments in Gujarat